György Buzinkay (born György Ferenc Buzinkay in Budapest in 1989) is a Hungarian politician, politologist and economist. He was a chairman for Momentum Movement. He was the candidate of United for Hungary at the 2022 Hungarian parliamentary election.

Family 
His father is Géza Buzinkay, a historian while his mother is Krisztina Rozsnyai, the official in charge of Magyar Felsőoktatási Akkreditációs Bizottság (Hungarian higher education accreditation commission). He is a member of the historic Buzinkay family. He lives in Szentendre.

Education 
He graduated from Eötvös Loránd University with bachelors in political science then he went to Corvinus University of Budapest where he got his masters in public management and public policy.

Politics 
He is a founder of the Momentum Movement and was it's chairman from 2018.

His party started him in the 2021 Hungarian opposition primary in Pest County 3rd parliamentary individual constituency which he won. In the 2022 elections he lost to Eszter Vitályos, the candidate of Fidesz.

In December 2022 he left Momentum and is now part of the Democratic Coalition party.

References 

Hungarian political scientists

Momentum Movement politicians
Democratic Coalition (Hungary) politicians
Politicians from Budapest
Eötvös Loránd University alumni
Corvinus University of Budapest alumni
1989 births
Living people